Tennesseellum formica is a spider in the family Linyphiidae. It is found in North America and the Marshall Islands.

References

Spiders of North America
Spiders of Oceania
Spiders described in 1882